The 2011 Ice Challenge was an international figure skating competition during the 2011–2012 season. An annual event, it was organized by the Austrian Figure Skating Association and sanctioned by the International Skating Union. 

Figure skaters competed in the disciplines of men's singles, ladies singles, pair skating, and ice dancing, with senior, junior, and novice levels. The competition was held in Graz, Austria from 1–6 November 2011.

The Ice Challenge was designated as one of the events at which skaters could try to achieve a minimum score.

Senior results

Men

Ladies

Pairs

Ice dancing

Junior results

Men

Ladies

Pairs

Ice dancing

Novice results

Men

Ladies

Ice dancing 
Pattern dance #1: Rocker Foxtrot; Pattern dance #2: Starlight Waltz

References

External links
Entries/Results

Ice Challenge
2011 in figure skating
Ice Challeng